Angola competed at the 2014 Summer Youth Olympics, in Nanjing, China from 16 August to 28 August 2014.

Athletics

Angola qualified one athlete.

Qualification Legend: Q=Final A (medal); qB=Final B (non-medal); qC=Final C (non-medal); qD=Final D (non-medal); qE=Final E (non-medal)

Boys
Track & road events

Handball

Angola qualified a girls' team based on its performance at the 2013 African Women's Youth Handball Championship.

Girls' tournament

Roster

 Amelia Caluyombo
 Alexandra Chaca
 Alcina Chitangueleca
 Joana Costa
 Nicol da Costa
 Fernanda Cungulo
 Lucinda Ganga
 Vilma Menganga
 Manuela Paulino
 Dalva Peres
 Marila Quizelete
 Vilma Silva
 Swelly Simao
 Jocelina Yanda

Group stage

5th Place Playoff

References

2014 in Angolan sport
Nations at the 2014 Summer Youth Olympics
Angola at the Youth Olympics